Bilyana Ilieva Raeva (born 12 July 1973 in Varna) is a Bulgarian politician who was a member of the 6th session of the European Parliament, 2007–2009. She is a member of the National Movement for Stability and Progress within the Alliance of Liberals and Democrats for Europe group.

References

1973 births
Living people
Women MEPs for Bulgaria
Alliance of Liberals and Democrats for Europe MEPs
MEPs for Bulgaria 2007–2009
Politicians from Varna, Bulgaria